Prisomera spinosissimum is a species of phasmid or stick insect of the genus Prisomera. It is found in India, Sri Lanka and Malaysia.

References

Phasmatodea
Insects of Asia
Insects described in 1907